Emine Sare Aydın (born 1975), is an academic, politician and 27th Parliament Member of the Justice and Development Party.

Life 
Emine Sare Aydın who is originally from Bayburt was born in 1975 in Zonguldak. She finished her higher education in German Studies at the İstanbul University.

Political career 
In the 2018 General Elections, she was elected as the Justice and Development Party Istanbul Member of Parliament and is currently serving in that position.

Sources 

Living people
Justice and Development Party (Turkey) politicians
Istanbul University alumni
1975 births
21st-century Turkish women politicians
Members of the 27th Parliament of Turkey
People from Bayburt